"The One with All the Cheesecakes" is the eleventh episode of Friends seventh season. It first aired on the NBC network in the United States on January 4, 2001.

Plot
Chandler eats from a box of cheesecake that was mistakenly delivered to his door instead of one of his neighbors and falls in love with it. He gives a bite to Rachel and she loves it too, but both of them feel guilty for stealing the cake. When another cheesecake gets delivered to his apartment by accident again two days later, Chandler and Rachel return the cheesecake to their neighbor's doorstep, before ironically heading to Chicago to eat lunch at the restaurant where the cheesecakes are made. Upon returning, they find the cheesecake untouched at their neighbor's door, and promptly steal it. Chandler catches Rachel eating the cheesecake alone and says he does not trust her with it. They decide to split it, but in the process; Rachel ends up dropping both her half in the hallway, and when Chandler gloats about it, she drops his half as well. Joey catches them eating the cheesecake on the floor and joins them without thinking twice.

Meanwhile, Monica feels bad that Ross was invited to their cousin Frannie's wedding while she was not. Ross tells Monica that they did not invite her to the wedding because there was limited seating available. Monica makes Ross cancel on his date Joan, the assistant professor from the linguistic department, by telling him that she cares about family and does not want to miss out on her cousin's wedding. Monica confronts Frannie at the wedding and asks her why she was not invited. She then realizes that Frannie has married Stuart, one of Monica's ex-boyfriends.

Phoebe and Joey make plans for their monthly dinner where they discuss the other four, but Joey cancels as he has a date. This annoys Phoebe and Joey tells her he will make it up to her by taking her out for dinner the next night. Phoebe bumps into David, the scientist guy, at Central Perk. David says that he is only in New York for one day for a conference on Positronic distillation of sub-atomic particles. He asks Phoebe out and Monica convinces her that she can make Joey understand why she cancelled on him. Phoebe decides that she will finish up with Joey early and then meet David. Joey finds out about her plans from Chandler and intentionally delays her at the restaurant. Phoebe tells him that she has a date with David and leaves to meet with him. The two manage to have a quick rendezvous at her apartment before David leaves for Minsk. He implies he loves her but says that saying it out loud would make it unbearable for him to leave her. Joey witnesses this and tries to comfort a saddened Phoebe, understanding how upset she felt the first time David left her.

Reception
Digital Spy picked the episode as one of the season's highlights. They also ranked it the eleventh best Friends episode.
GamesRadar+ ranked it the fourteenth best episode from the show.
BuzzFeed ranked "The One with All the Cheesecakes" #50 on their list of the 53 most iconic Friends episodes.
Telegraph & Argus ranked it #4 on their ranking of the 236 Friends episodes.

References

2001 American television episodes
Friends (season 7) episodes